Goldey–Beacom College is a private university in Pike Creek Valley, Delaware. It uses a semester-based academic calendar and is accredited to award certificates, associate, baccalaureate, master's, and doctoral degrees. The institution traces its origins to 1886 when H. S. Goldey opened the Wilmington Commercial College.

Campus

Academics
The university awards graduate and undergraduate degrees in a number of disciplines including economics, psychology, computer information systems, and business. It also offers graduate degrees in business and finance.

Accreditation
Goldey-Beacom is accredited by the Middle States Commission on Higher Education to award degrees through the doctoral level. Some of its programs are also accredited by the Association of Collegiate Business Schools and Programs (ACBSP) and the International Assembly for Collegiate Business Education (IACBE).

Athletics

The Goldey–Beacom athletic teams are called the Lightning. The college is a member of the NCAA Division II ranks in all sports, primarily competing as a member of the Central Atlantic Collegiate Conference (CACC) since the 1999–2000 academic year.

Goldey–Beacom competes in 13 intercollegiate varsity sports: Men's sports include baseball, basketball, cross country, golf, soccer and track & field; while women's sports include basketball, cross country, soccer, softball, tennis, volleyball and track & field.

References

External links 

 
Official athletics website

 
Private universities and colleges in Delaware
Educational institutions established in 1886
Education in New Castle County, Delaware
Buildings and structures in Wilmington, Delaware
Liberal arts colleges in Delaware
1886 establishments in Delaware